Executive Branch Reform Act may refer to:

Executive Branch Reform Act of 1986, Oklahoma state law
Executive Branch Reform Act of 2007, a proposed United States law